Pak Kret Pier (sometimes spelled Pakkret), with designated pier number N33.

Description
Pak Kret Pier is a pier on Chao Phraya River in Tambon Pak Kret, Amphoe Pak Kret, Nonthaburi Province, considered the last stop of Chao Phraya Express Boat that runs from Asiatique: The Riverfront in Bangkok. Maintained by City of Pak Kret.

Pak Kret Pier located beneath Rama IV Bridge and next to Wat Bo temple. Moreover, there is another pier nearby provide ferry services to Ko Kret, a Mon settlement and another interesting cultural attraction of Nonthaburi, include Wat Toei in Tambon Bang Tanai as well.

The area around Pak Kret Pier is also full of many shops, restaurants and bus stop, can be considered as a terminal of many bus routes. Moreover, it has a yummy noodles shop and is famous for at least two shops, include one wooden Thai restaurant on the Chao Phraya River as well.

Transportation
 Chao Phraya Express Boat: only green flag boat (from Sathorn in Bangkok terminate here but serving only few rounds a day (from here to Bangkok operate in the morning from 06.00 a.m. to 08.15 a.m. only and from Bangkok to here the first trip starts at 03.30 p.m. and the last trip is 06.05 p.m.) no service on holidays and public holidays)
 BMTA bus: route 32, 35, 52, 103, 104, 150, 166, 356 (commuter bus), 505, 506, 751

References

External links
Chao Phraya Express Boat

Buildings and structures in Nonthaburi province
Chao Phraya Express Boat piers